Mustafa Çağrıcı is a Turkish former mufti of Istanbul.

In 2018 he claimed “The Diyanet of today has a more Islamist, more Arab worldview”.

References

External links
Office the Mufti of Istanbul official website 
Mustafa Cagrici personal web site

1950 births
Living people
People from Sivas
Marmara University alumni
Academic staff of Marmara University
Turkish muftis
Turkish civil servants
Turkish Sunni Muslims
Muftis of Istanbul